Wojdat or Woydat is a surname. Notable people with the surname include:

 Vaidotas (fl. 1362), son of Kęstutis, Grand Duke of Lithuania
 Artur Wojdat (born 1968), Polish swimmer

See also
 Wojda
 Wojdan